The 2009 season was the Minnesota Vikings' 49th in the National Football League and their fourth under head coach Brad Childress. The Vikings improved upon their 10–6 record and defended their NFC North title from 2008, their first successful defense of a divisional title since they won six NFC Central titles in a row between 1973 and 1978. They beat the Dallas Cowboys in the NFC Divisional Playoff at the Hubert H. Humphrey Metrodome in Minneapolis, but lost the NFC Championship Game in overtime to the eventual Super Bowl champion New Orleans Saints, missing out on what would have been their first Super Bowl since Super Bowl XI in 1976. This year's NFC Championship Game is also dubbed by many as the "Bountygate Game" that also resulted in several players and coaching staff (including head coach Sean Payton) receiving 12-month suspensions three years later. The Vikings had 10 Pro Bowlers and four All-Pros on their roster, both league-highs for the season.

Offseason

Player and personnel moves
Quarterback Brett Favre announced that he would not sign with the Minnesota Vikings on July 28, 2009, after much speculation that he would. Less than a month later, however, Favre signed a 2-year contract worth $25 million with the Vikings.

Releases and injuries
On February 18, the team released running back Maurice Hicks.

On February 27, the team released quarterback Gus Frerotte.

On March 3, the team released linebacker Vinny Ciurciu.

On March 4, free agent center Matt Birk left the Vikings to join the Baltimore Ravens.

On March 18, free agent safety Darren Sharper left the Vikings to join the New Orleans Saints.

Signings and extensions

On February 24, the team re-signed cornerback Charles Gordon to a 1-year $1 million contract.

On February 26, the team re-signed defensive end Jayme Mitchell to a 2-year deal.

On February 27, the Vikings traded a 2009 4th round pick to the Houston Texans for quarterback Sage Rosenfels. They then signed Rosenfels to a 2-year $9 million contract extension that will run through 2011.

On February 27, the team re-signed tight end Jim Kleinsasser to a 3-year $9 million contract.

On March 6, the team re-signed linebacker Heath Farwell to a 3-year $7.75 million contract.

On March 9, the team re-signed cornerback Benny Sapp to a 1-year contract.

On March 11, the team re-signed defensive tackle Jimmy Kennedy to a 1-year contract.

On March 19, the Vikings signed cornerback Karl Paymah and wide receiver Glenn Holt.

On March 21, cornerback Cedric Griffin signed a 3-year contract extension.

On March 27, the team matched the Bengals' offer sheet for RFA fullback Naufahu Tahi.

On March 31, the team re-signed defensive end Otis Grigsby to a 1-year deal.

On April 6, the team re-signed defensive tackle Fred Evans to a 1-year deal.

On July 24, Antoine Winfield and the Vikings agreed on a 5-year extension through the 2013 season.

On August 18, after months of negotiations, the team signed formerly retired quarterback Brett Favre.

Draft

The Vikings had five selections in the 2009 NFL Draft; they had traded their fourth-round selection to the Houston Texans for quarterback Sage Rosenfels and, back in 2007, they had traded their sixth-round selection to the Philadelphia Eagles in exchange for quarterback Kelly Holcomb. In 2008, they received an extra 2009 seventh-round selection from the Washington Redskins for defensive end Erasmus James, but they used that extra pick to move from spot #158 to #150 in the fifth round.

The Vikings' top two selections, WR Percy Harvin and OT Phil Loadholt, both soon became 1st string players, while Jasper Brinkley finished the season as the team's starting MLB after E.J. Henderson suffered a broken leg in a Week 13 game against the Arizona Cardinals. Harvin was also voted the Offensive Rookie of the Year and was named as the NFC's starting kick returner for the 2010 Pro Bowl on January 31, 2010.

 The Vikings traded their fourth-round selection (122nd overall) to the Houston Texans in exchange for QB Sage Rosenfels.
 The Vikings traded their fifth-round selection (158th overall) and the seventh-round selection they received from the Washington Redskins (221st overall) for DE Erasmus James back to Washington in exchange for the Redskins' fifth-round selection (150th overall).
 The Vikings traded their sixth-round selection (195th overall) to the Philadelphia Eagles in exchange for QB Kelly Holcomb.

Preseason

Schedule

Game summaries

Week 1: at Indianapolis Colts

Week 2: vs. Kansas City Chiefs

Brett Favre made his Minnesota Vikings debut, going 1–4 for just four yards and no first downs converted in his two series under center; he nonetheless got a standing ovation from the sellout crowd at the Metrodome. Tarvaris Jackson completed two touchdowns, a 13-yard score to Visanthe Shiancoe and a 64-yarder to Darius Reynaud.

Week 3: at Houston Texans

Brett Favre completed 13 of 18 passes for 142 yards, including a 28-yard touchdown pass to running back Chester Taylor. Favre even got physical, laying a block (albeit an illegal one) on Texans safety Eugene Wilson.

Week 4: vs. Dallas Cowboys

Regular season
As well as playing their NFC North rivals both at home and on the road, the Vikings were scheduled to face opponents from the AFC North and the NFC West. They were also handed fixtures against the Carolina Panthers from the NFC South and the New York Giants from the NFC East by virtue of having won their division in 2008. Based on their opponents' results in 2008, the Vikings had the second-easiest schedule in the league in 2009, with their opponents having an overall record of 107–148–1 (.420) in 2008.

Schedule

Game summaries

Week 1: at Cleveland Browns

The Vikings began their season at Cleveland Browns Stadium for a Week 1 interconference duel with the Cleveland Browns. In the first quarter, Minnesota trailed as Browns kicker Phil Dawson got a 37-yard field goal. The Vikings answered with kicker Ryan Longwell making a 21-yard field goal. In the second quarter, Minnesota took the lead as running back Adrian Peterson got a 1-yard touchdown run. Cleveland retook their lead as Dawson kicked a 20-yard field goal, along with wide receiver Joshua Cribbs returning a punt 67 yards for a touchdown.

In the third quarter, the Vikings took control as Peterson got a 1-yard touchdown run, along with quarterback Brett Favre completing a 6-yard touchdown pass to rookie wide receiver Percy Harvin. Afterwards, Minnesota put the game out of reach in the fourth quarter; Ryan Longwell nailed a 37-yard field goal, while Adrian Peterson got a 64-yard touchdown run. The Browns closed out the game with quarterback Brady Quinn completing a 26-yard touchdown pass to tight end Robert Royal.

With the win, the Vikings began their season at 1–0.

Week 2: at Detroit Lions

Coming off their road win over the Browns, the Vikings flew to Ford Field for a Week 2 NFC North duel with the Detroit Lions. Minnesota trailed early as Lions kicker Jason Hanson got a 30-yard field goal. Detroit added to their lead in the second quarter as quarterback Matthew Stafford completed an 8-yard touchdown pass to wide receiver Calvin Johnson. The Vikings ended the half with a 1-yard touchdown pass from quarterback Brett Favre to tight end Visanthe Shiancoe.

In the third quarter, Minnesota took the lead as kicker Ryan Longwell made a 46-yard field goal, followed by running back Adrian Peterson getting a 27-yard touchdown run. The Vikings pulled away as Longwell nailed a 46-yard field goal, followed by Favre completing a 3-yard touchdown pass to rookie wide receiver Percy Harvin. The Lions completed the scoring as Hanson got a 48-yard field goal.

With the win, the Vikings improved to 2–0.

Week 3: vs. San Francisco 49ers

Coming off their divisional road win over the Lions, the Vikings played their Week 3 home opener against the San Francisco 49ers. Minnesota opened in the first quarter with quarterback Brett Favre's 30-yard touchdown pass to wide receiver Sidney Rice. The Vikings added onto their lead in the second quarter with kicker Ryan Longwell's 40-yard field goal, but the 49ers answered with quarterback Shaun Hill's 5-yard touchdown pass to tight end Vernon Davis. Minnesota came back with Longwell's 52-yard field goal, but San Francisco took the lead prior to halftime as cornerback Nate Clements returned a blocked field goal 59 yards for a touchdown.

The 49ers increased their lead in the second half with kicker Joe Nedney's 37-yard field goal, but the Vikings immediately responded with rookie wide receiver Percy Harvin returning a kickoff 101 yards for a touchdown. In the fourth quarter, San Francisco got the lead again with Hill hooking up with Davis on a 20-yard touchdown pass. Afterwards, Minnesota came up with a dramatic win as Favre completed a game-winning 32-yard touchdown pass to wide receiver Greg Lewis with 2 seconds remaining in the game. The pass was later awarded an ESPY for "Best Play". The game was also voted as the best game of the regular season by voters on NFL.com.

With the win, the Vikings improved to 3–0.

Week 4: vs. Green Bay Packers

Coming off their last-second win over the 49ers, the Vikings stayed at home, donned their throwback uniforms, and prepared for the highly anticipated Week 4 NFC North Monday Night Football duel with the Green Bay Packers. This was a key divisional match-up, as the division lead was on the line, while quarterback Brett Favre was pitted against his former team. Favre entered the stadium to a series of boos coming from Green Bay fans throughout the stadium.

Minnesota started off the first quarter with Favre completing a 1-yard touchdown pass to tight end Visanthe Shiancoe. The Packers responded with quarterback Aaron Rodgers completing a 62-yard touchdown pass to tight end Jermichael Finley. In the second quarter, the Vikings struck again with a 14-yard touchdown pass from Favre to wide receiver Sidney Rice, but Green Bay answered with linebacker Clay Matthews stripping running back Adrian Peterson of the ball and returning it 42 yards for a touchdown. The Vikings closed out the half with a 1-yard touchdown run from Peterson.

Minnesota began to build a lead in the third quarter as Favre hooked up with wide receiver Bernard Berrian on a 31-yard touchdown pass. In the fourth quarter, the Vikings solidified their lead as defensive end Jared Allen sacked Rodgers in the Green Bay endzone for a safety. The Packers rallied with a 33-yard touchdown pass from Rodgers to wide receiver Jordy Nelson (with a failed 2-point conversion), followed by kicker Mason Crosby nailing a 31-yard field goal. However, the Packers' push came too late and Minnesota was able to run out the clock for the win.

With the victory, not only did the Vikings improve to 4–0, but Favre became the first quarterback in NFL history to defeat all 32 NFL teams.

Allen had a spectacular single-game performance with a career-best 4.5 sacks. Favre was awarded the NFC Offensive Player of the Week, marking the 14th time in his career he has earned this award.

Week 5: at St. Louis Rams

Coming off an impressive divisional home win over the Packers, the Vikings flew to the Edward Jones Dome for a Week 5 duel with the St. Louis Rams. Minnesota got off to a fast start in the first quarter as running back Adrian Peterson got a 5-yard touchdown run, followed by defensive end Jared Allen's 52-yard fumble return for a touchdown. The Rams got on the board with kicker Josh Brown making a 29-yard field goal, but the Vikings replied with kicker Ryan Longwell booting a 47-yard field goal.

Minnesota kept its dominating performance going in the third quarter as quarterback Brett Favre hooked up with tight end Visanthe Shiancoe on a 13-yard touchdown pass. In the fourth quarter, the Vikings continued to pull away as Peterson got a 7-yard touchdown run. St. Louis tried to rally with a 27-yard touchdown pass from quarterback Marc Bulger to wide receiver Donnie Avery, but Minnesota closed out the game with a 1-yard touchdown run from running back Chester Taylor.

With the win, not only did the Vikings make their first 5–0 start since 2003, but Favre earned his first 5–0 start in his career.

Week 6: vs. Baltimore Ravens

Coming off their easy road win over the Rams, the Vikings went home for a Week 6 inter-conference duel with the Baltimore Ravens. Minnesota got off to a fast start in the first quarter with quarterback Brett Favre completing a 19-yard touchdown pass to tight end Visanthe Shiancoe and a 4-yard touchdown pass to wide receiver Bernard Berrian. Afterwards, the Ravens got the only points of the second quarter as kicker Steven Hauschka getting a 29-yard field goal.

In the third quarter, the Vikings picked up where they left off with a 40-yard field goal from kicker Ryan Longwell. Baltimore responded with a 22-yard touchdown run from running back Ray Rice, yet Longwell helped out Minnesota by nailing a 22-yard field goal. Afterwards, an action-packed fourth quarter ensued. Minnesota increased its lead with Favre hooking up with Shiancoe again on a 1-yard touchdown pass, but the Ravens continued to hang around as quarterback Joe Flacco found wide receiver Mark Clayton on a 32-yard touchdown pass. The Vikings replied with Longwell's 29-yard field goal, but Baltimore took lead for the first time in the game as Flacco hooked up with wide receiver Derrick Mason on a 12-yard touchdown pass and Rice running 33 yards for a touchdown. Minnesota then regained the lead as Longwell booted a 31-yard field goal after a 58-yard pass from quarterback Brett Favre to wide receiver Sidney Rice. The Ravens got a last-minute drive into scoring range, but Hauschka's 44-yard field goal attempt went wide left, preserving the Vikings' perfect season.

With the win, the Vikings acquired their first 6–0 start since 2003 (unfortunately that team did not make the playoffs). Also, dating back to Week 17 of the 2008 season, Minnesota has won seven-straight regular season games for the first time since 2000.

Week 7: at Pittsburgh Steelers

Coming off their thrilling home win over the Ravens, the Vikings flew to Heinz Field for a Week 7 interconference duel with the defending Super Bowl champion Pittsburgh Steelers. Minnesota trailed late in the first quarter as Steelers kicker Jeff Reed got a 39-yard field goal, but they took the lead in the second quarter as running back Adrian Peterson got a 1-yard touchdown. However, Pittsburgh retook the lead as quarterback Ben Roethlisberger hooked up with wide receiver Mike Wallace on a 40-yard touchdown pass.

Both teams exchanged field goals in the third quarter as Reed nailed a 27-yard field goal, while Vikings kicker Ryan Longwell booted an 18-yard field goal. In the fourth quarter, Minnesota began to trail big as Vikings quarterback Brett Favre was stripped by defensive end Brett Keisel, causing a 77-yard fumble return for a touchdown by linebacker LaMarr Woodley. The Vikings immediately struck back with rookie wide receiver Percy Harvin's 88-yard kickoff return for a touchdown, but the Steelers' defense answered right back with linebacker Keyaron Fox's 82-yard interception return for a touchdown. The Vikings could not come back to win. The Steelers ended up winning 27–17.

With the loss, Minnesota fell to 6–1.

Week 8: at Green Bay Packers

Hoping to rebound from their first loss of the season to the Steelers, the Vikings flew to Lambeau Field for the highly anticipated Week 8 divisional rematch with the Green Bay Packers, as quarterback Brett Favre made his first return to Lambeau since initially retiring after the 2007 season.

In the first quarter, the Packers scored the game's first points as kicker Mason Crosby made a 37-yard field goal following a miscue by Vikings center John Sullivan (Favre audibled for another play but Sullivan snapped the ball before Favre completed his audible). Minnesota responded with a 1-yard touchdown from running back Adrian Peterson. In the second quarter, the Vikings added onto their lead as Favre completed a 12-yard touchdown pass to tight end Visanthe Shiancoe, followed by kicker Ryan Longwell (another former Packer) nailing a 41-yard field goal.

Minnesota picked up where they left off in the third quarter as Favre hooked up with rookie wide receiver Percy Harvin on a 51-yard touchdown pass, yet Green Bay started to rally as Crosby booted a 26-yard field goal, followed by quarterback Aaron Rodgers finding tight end Spencer Havner on a 16-yard and a 5-yard touchdown pass. The Vikings answered in the fourth quarter with Favre connecting with tight end/fullback Jeff Dugan on a 2-yard touchdown pass. The Packers tried to come back as Rodgers completed a 10-yard touchdown pass to wide receiver Greg Jennings (with a failed 2-point conversion), but Minnesota pulled away with Favre finding wide receiver Bernard Berrian on a 16-yard touchdown pass.

With their first season-sweep of the Packers in four years, the Vikings went into their bye week at 7–1, and took a commanding -game lead in the NFC North over the second-place Packers. Favre threw at least 4 touchdowns for the 21st time in his career, matching the NFL record held by Dan Marino. This also marks Vikings head coach Brad Childress' first win at Green Bay (he is 3–5 overall against the Packers) and the Vikings' first sweep of the Packers since 2005.

Week 9: Bye week
During the Vikings' bye week, both Green Bay and Chicago lost their games (to Tampa Bay 38–28 and Arizona 41–21 respectively), allowing the Vikings to gain a three-game lead in the division standings and moving them a step closer to qualification for the playoffs and first round bye.

Week 10: vs. Detroit Lions

Coming off their bye week, the Vikings were at home and met in an NFC North duel with the Detroit Lions, who hadn't won in the Metrodome since 1997. In the first quarter, the Vikings scored the period's only points as kicker Ryan Longwell nailed a 22-yard field goal. They increased their lead in the second quarter as running back Adrian Peterson scored on a 22-yard touchdown run. However, Lions kicker Jason Hanson kicked a 38-yard field goal late in the quarter. At the beginning of the second half, a fumble by the Lions on their first play from scrimmage was recovered at their 29-yard line by the Vikings. Peterson ran twice on the ensuing drive, scoring on a 1-yard touchdown run to make it a 17–3 lead. The Lions responded with a 15-play, 84-yard drive, capped off by an 8-yard touchdown pass from Matthew Stafford to tight end Will Heller. Nevertheless, the Vikings pulled away in the fourth quarter as Favre completed an 8-yard pass to tight end Jeff Dugan and kicker Ryan Longwell nailed a 35-yard field goal.

With the win, the Vikings moved to 8–1, and compiled a 4–0 record against their NFC North rivals. The Vikings accrued nearly 500 yards of total offense, including 303 yards in the first half alone. The Vikings also had 13 penalties, a season-high. Wide receiver Sidney Rice had a big day, catching seven passes for 201 yards, including a 56-yard reception in the opening seconds of the fourth quarter. Rice was named NFC Offensive Player of the Week for Week 10, the first time he has received this award. Favre and Peterson were voted FedEx Air and Ground Players of the Week.

Week 11: vs. Seattle Seahawks

Coming off their penalty-plagued blowout win over the Lions, the Vikings stayed at home and met in a Week 11 duel with the Seattle Seahawks. After a scoreless first quarter, the Vikings got on the board with quarterback Brett Favre completing a 23-yard touchdown pass to wide receiver Percy Harvin. Later in the same quarter, the Vikings increased their lead with an 8-yard touchdown pass from Favre to tight end Visanthe Shiancoe. Closing out the first half was a 3-yard touchdown pass from Favre to wide receiver Bernard Berrian to make a 21–0 Vikings halftime lead, the first time of the season the Vikings kept their opponent scoreless in the first half. In the third quarter, the Vikings continued to dominate as Favre found wide receiver Sidney Rice on a 7-yard touchdown pass. Seattle scored their first points of the game when kicker Olindo Mare nailed a 40-yard field goal. Finally, the Vikings put the game away as second-string quarterback Tarvaris Jackson found Rice again on a 34-yard touchdown pass. The Seahawks tried to rally with a 1-yard touchdown run by running back Justin Forsett (with a failed two-point conversion), but the Vikings prevented the Seahawks comeback from advancing any further.

With the win, the Vikings improved to 9–1. Brett Favre threw four touchdown passes for the 22nd time in his career (second of the season), breaking the mark set by Dan Marino.

Week 12: vs. Chicago Bears

Coming off their easy win over the Seahawks, the Vikings stayed at home, donned their throwback uniforms, and faced the Chicago Bears in a Week 12 duel. After a scoreless first quarter, the Vikings drew first blood as quarterback Brett Favre completed a 15-yard touchdown pass to rookie wide receiver Percy Harvin. The Bears responded with quarterback Jay Cutler firing a 24-yard touchdown pass to wide receiver Johnny Knox. The Vikings responded with Favre hooking up with running back Chester Taylor on a 10-yard touchdown pass, along with kicker Ryan Longwell nailing a 52-yard field goal. Finally, the Vikings closed out the first half with Favre finding tight end Visanthe Shiancoe on a 6-yard touchdown pass. In the third quarter, the Bears tried to rally with kicker Robbie Gould nailing a 38-yard field goal. However, the Vikings finally shut out the Bears for the rest of the second half, and kicker Ryan Longwell made field goals of 37 and 20 yards. Running back Adrian Peterson also had a 5-yard touchdown run, though the extra point attempt was missed.

With the win, the Vikings improved to 10–1, and compiled a 5–0 record against their NFC North rivals. Their magic number decreased to two, meaning that any combination of two Vikings wins or Packers losses would result in the Vikings clinching their second consecutive NFC North division title. On Wednesday, December 2, Brett Favre was named the NFC Offensive Player of the Month for November; it was the sixth time in his career that he won the award.

Week 13: at Arizona Cardinals

Coming off their easy home win over the Bears, the Vikings flew to the desert for a Week 13 Sunday Night duel with the defending NFC champion Arizona Cardinals. In the first quarter, Minnesota got on the board with quarterback Brett Favre completing a 3-yard touchdown pass to tight end Visanthe Shiancoe. It was originally ruled an incomplete pass as Shiancoe was deemed to have stepped out of bounds, but Minnesota challenged and won based on the fact that Shiancoe had both feet inbounds and the referee counted Shiancoe's third step, thereby making the original ruling on the field to be overturned. The Cardinals then responded with quarterback Kurt Warner finding wide receiver Anquan Boldin on a 2-yard touchdown pass.

In the second quarter, Arizona took the lead with Warner finding Boldin again on a 39-yard touchdown pass. The Vikings responded with kicker Ryan Longwell nailing a 25-yard field goal. However, the Cardinals took the lead at halftime when Warner completed a 34-yard touchdown pass to wide receiver Larry Fitzgerald. In the third quarter, Arizona increased their lead when kicker Neil Rackers kicked field goals of 31 and 30 yards. In the fourth quarter, Arizona kicker Neil Rackers nailed a 29-yard field goal. However, the Vikings tried to rally with Favre hooking up with rookie wide receiver Percy Harvin on a 31-yard touchdown pass. The Vikings tried an onside kick, which they did not recover and Arizona ran out the clock to seal their win.

With only their second loss of the season, the Vikings not only fell to 10–2, but they lost starting linebacker E. J. Henderson to a season-ending broken leg.

Week 14: vs. Cincinnati Bengals

Hoping to rebound from their devastating Sunday Night loss to the Cardinals, the Vikings went home and met the Cincinnati Bengals in a Week 14 duel. After a scoreless first quarter, Minnesota took first blood as kicker Ryan Longwell nailed a 41-yard field goal. They increased their lead later in the quarter with quarterback Brett Favre finding wide receiver Sidney Rice on a 9-yard touchdown pass. Cincinnati responded with quarterback Carson Palmer finding wide receiver Chad Ochocinco on a 15-yard touchdown pass, however the Vikings quickly scored two field goals by kicker Ryan Longwell (from 23 and 44 yards out) to put the Vikings up 16–7 at halftime. In the third quarter, the Vikings scored the period's only points as running back Adrian Peterson got a 1-yard touchdown run. In the fourth quarter, Cincinnati tried to rally with kicker Shayne Graham nailing a 22-yard field goal, but the Vikings put the game away with running back Adrian Peterson's 3-yard touchdown run.

With the win, the Vikings not only improved to 11–2 on the season, they also secured a playoff berth for the second consecutive season and improved upon the record from the previous season (10–6). Their "magic number" decreased to one, meaning that either a Green Bay loss at Pittsburgh or a Vikings win against Carolina on Sunday night would make Minnesota repeat division champions for the first time since 1978, when they won six consecutive NFC Central titles. Also, if the Eagles lost against San Francisco, the Vikings would also clinch a first-round bye in the NFC playoffs.

Week 15: at Carolina Panthers

Coming off their home win over the Bengals, the Vikings flew to Bank of America Stadium to face the Carolina Panthers in a Week 15 Sunday Night duel. The Vikings clinched the NFC North about an hour before the game thanks in part to Pittsburgh's 37–36 last-second win over the Packers. With a win, the Vikings would be one game behind New Orleans to clinch homefield advantage. After a scoreless first quarter, Carolina got on the board with quarterback Matt Moore finding fullback Brad Hoover on a 1-yard touchdown pass. The extra point attempt was blocked, however. The Vikings then took the lead later in the quarter with running back Adrian Peterson's 4-yard touchdown run. After yet another scoreless quarter, it was all Carolina as Matt Moore completed a 42-yard touchdown pass to wide receiver Steve Smith, as well as running back Jonathan Stewart running in a 3-yard touchdown, as well as catching a 2-yard touchdown pass from Moore.

With the loss, the Vikings fell to 11–3. Reports surfaced after the game suggesting that there was tension between Vikings quarterback Brett Favre and head coach Brad Childress. The incident was later resolved.

Week 16: at Chicago Bears

Hoping to rebound from their fourth-quarter collapse to the Panthers, the Vikings flew to Soldier Field to face Jay Cutler and the Chicago Bears in a Week 16 rematch to conclude the 40th season of Monday Night Football. Due to the Saints losing to Tampa Bay 20–17 in overtime the previous day, the Vikings needed to win their last two games and have the Saints lose to Carolina the next week in order to clinch homefield advantage. In the first quarter, the Bears drew first blood as kicker Robbie Gould nailed a 22-yard field goal for the only score of the period. In the second quarter, the Bears increased their lead with Gould nailing a 42-yard field goal. They increased their lead with Cutler firing a 7-yard touchdown pass to tight end Greg Olsen. The Bears then closed out the first half with Gould's 41-yard field goal.

In the third quarter, the Vikes started to rally with running back Adrian Peterson's 1-yard touchdown run (with the extra point attempt blocked). The Bears increased their lead over the Vikings with Cutler's 2-yard touchdown pass to tight end Desmond Clark. The Vikings then closed out the quarter with quarterback Brett Favre firing a 6-yard touchdown pass to tight end Visanthe Shiancoe. An exciting fourth quarter ensued. The Vikings started out the quarter's scoring with kicker Ryan Longwell's 41-yard field goal, along with Adrian Peterson's second 1-yard touchdown run. The Bears then responded with Cutler firing a 20-yard touchdown pass to wide receiver Earl Bennett. The Vikings then completed the remarkable comeback with Favre finding wide receiver Sidney Rice on a 6-yard touchdown pass on 4th-and-goal with 15 seconds left in regulation. The Bears then took a knee to force overtime. In overtime, the Bears won the toss and marched down the field, stopping at the 35-yard line. However, the potential game-winning 45-yard field goal attempt by Gould went wide right, giving the Vikings a chance to win. After an exchange of punts, the Vikings had the ball at the 26-yard line with 11 minutes left in the period. On the first play of scrimmage, Favre fired a screen pass to Peterson who caught it and went 16 yards, before being confronted by Hunter Hillenmeyer, who caused Peterson to fumble the ball, which was then recovered by Bears' linebacker Nick Roach. The Bears then won on Jay Cutler's game-winning 39-yard touchdown pass to wide receiver Devin Aromashodu.

With the loss, not only did the Vikings fall to 11–4, they also surrendered homefield advantage to the Saints.

Week 17: vs. New York Giants

Hoping to break a two-game primetime losing skid, the Vikings went home to Mall of America Field for the Week 17 season finale against the New York Giants. The Vikings needed a win and an Eagles loss to Dallas later in the day in order to clinch a first-round bye in the playoffs. They also came into the game hoping to go 8–0 at home for the first time since the 15–1 season of 1998. The Vikings drew first blood in the first quarter with quarterback Brett Favre finding tight end Visanthe Shiancoe (a former Giant) on a 10-yard touchdown pass for the only score of the period. In the second quarter, the Vikings increased their lead with kicker Ryan Longwell's 41-yard field goal. Later in the quarter, it was all touchdowns as Adrian Peterson scored from one yard out, as well as Favre firing two touchdown passes to wide receiver Sidney Rice from 4 and 12 yards out. The 31–0 halftime lead was the second time of the season that the Vikes shut out their opponent in the first half, as well as tying a franchise record for the largest halftime lead. In the third quarter, the Vikings continued to destroy the Giants with Favre's 1-yard touchdown pass to fullback Naufahu Tahi on 4th-and-goal, along with kicker Ryan Longwell's field goals of 24 and 27 yards. The Giants only mustered a 1-yard touchdown run in the fourth quarter by running back Danny Ware.

With the win, the Vikings improved to 12–4, the franchise's best record since the 15–1 1998 campaign. With Dallas beating Philadelphia 24–0 later in the day, the Vikings clinched a first-round bye. Brett Favre threw at least four touchdown passes for the third time this season, as well as being honored with his third NFC Offensive Player of the Week award. The three awards are the most he has received in one season in his 19-year NFL career.

Standings

Postseason

Schedule

Game summaries

NFC Wildcard Round: Bye week
As the NFC second-seed, the Minnesota Vikings received a bye to the Divisional Round.

NFC Divisional Round: vs. Dallas Cowboys

This game began while many TV show hosts and sports analysts were convinced that a red-hot Dallas team was going to end the Vikings' explosive season with Brett Favre. Tony Romo had been throwing more accurately than ever, and because the Vikings had a week off, even their own fans were feeling the pressure of facing a tough Dallas team.

Entering the playoffs as the NFC's number 2 seed, the Vikings began their playoff run at home in the NFC Divisional Round against the number 3 Dallas Cowboys. Minnesota delivered the opening strike in the first quarter as quarterback Brett Favre found wide receiver Sidney Rice on a 47-yard touchdown pass. The Cowboys got on the board in the second quarter with a 33-yard field goal from kicker Shaun Suisham, yet the Vikings came right back with Favre hooking up with Rice again on a 16-yard touchdown pass, followed by a 23-yard field goal from kicker Ryan Longwell. After a scoreless third quarter, Minnesota delivered the final strike in the fourth quarter as Longwell nailed a 28-yard field goal, followed by Favre's 45-yard touchdown pass to Rice and his 11-yard touchdown pass to tight end Visanthe Shiancoe.

With the win, the Vikings advanced to their ninth NFC Championship Game in team history, and their first appearance since the 2000 season with a 13–4 record. Brett Favre became the oldest player to start and win a playoff game, but also won his first postseason game in four against Dallas. This would be the Vikings' final win in a playoff game until (after) 2017. This was also the last playoff game ever in the Metrodome, as the Vikings would not win the division again until the 2015 season, when they were playing at TCF Bank Stadium while waiting for U.S. Bank Stadium to be completed.

NFC Championship Game: at New Orleans Saints

Coming off their dominant divisional home win over the Cowboys, the Vikings flew to the Louisiana Superdome for the NFC Championship Game against the top-seeded New Orleans Saints. Minnesota delivered the opening strike in the first quarter with running back Adrian Peterson's 19-yard touchdown run. The Saints answered with quarterback Drew Brees completing a 38-yard touchdown pass to running back Pierre Thomas, yet the Vikings regained the lead as quarterback Brett Favre found wide receiver Sidney Rice on a 5-yard touchdown pass. In the second quarter, New Orleans tied the game again on Brees' 9-yard touchdown pass to wide receiver Devery Henderson.

The Saints took the lead in the third quarter with Thomas' 9-yard touchdown run, yet Minnesota tied the game as Peterson got a 1-yard touchdown run. In the fourth quarter, New Orleans got the lead again as Brees hooked up with running back Reggie Bush on a 5-yard touchdown pass, yet the Vikings tied the game again with Peterson's 2-yard touchdown run. After stopping the Saints offense the Vikings got the ball back and were close to field goal range in the final 30 seconds when they were flagged for too many men on the field; on the next play Favre rolled to the right as a hole opened up, but instead of running forward he threw the ball deep across his body and it was picked off by the Saints' Tracy Porter, forcing overtime.

In overtime, after a 40-yard kickoff return by Pierre Thomas, New Orleans drove downfield, converting on 4th-and-1 before a controversial pass interference penalty against linebacker Ben Leber brought them into field goal range. Three plays later, Saints kicker Garrett Hartley nailed the game-ending 40-yard field goal.

With the loss, the Vikings' season ended with an overall record of 13–5. Doomed by turnovers – the Vikings had six fumbles, three of which they lost, plus two interceptions by Brett Favre – the Vikings lost another NFC Championship Game in overtime, this one reminiscent of the 1998–99 loss to the Falcons in the Metrodome. The Saints' performance in the game, and leading into it, would later be subject to investigation, as it was eventually revealed that the Saints had been involved in a bounty program beginning in the 2009 season.

Statistics

Team leaders

* Vikings single season record

League rankings

Pro Bowl
Eight Minnesota Vikings players were originally selected for the 2010 Pro Bowl: five on offense (Brett Favre, Adrian Peterson, Sidney Rice, Bryant McKinnie and Steve Hutchinson), two on defense (Jared Allen and Kevin Williams) and one special teamer (Heath Farwell). Of these, six were selected to start the game, with Favre and Rice going as reserves. However, as Philadelphia Eagles wide receiver DeSean Jackson was voted as a starter at both wide receiver and kickoff returner, a replacement had to be selected at KR; Percy Harvin was added to the roster on January 4, 2010, making it nine Vikings in the NFC roster. Antoine Winfield was added to the NFC roster as an extra cornerback on January 19, 2010, bringing the Vikings' contribution to the roster to 10 players.

Had the Vikings reached Super Bowl XLIV, none of their players would have appeared in the 2010 Pro Bowl, but they lost to the New Orleans Saints in the NFC Championship Game. Nevertheless, QB Brett Favre (ankle), CB Antoine Winfield (foot) and KR Percy Harvin (migraine headaches) all pulled out as a result of their various ailments. OT Bryant McKinnie was cut from the NFC roster on January 30 after missing four of the five practice sessions and attending only one team meeting; he claimed, via text message to the Star Tribune, that his absence was due to a lack of physical fitness. McKinnie was not replaced in the roster and was also fined his game check.

Staff

Roster

References

External links

2009 Minnesota Vikings season at Pro Football Reference
2009 Minnesota Vikings season at ESPN

Minnesota
Minnesota Vikings seasons
NFC North championship seasons
Minnesota